Megalotica aphoristis is a moth of the family Geometridae. It was first described by Edward Meyrick in 1899. It is endemic to the island of Hawaii.

It has a bronzy-brown coloration.

Robert Cyril Layton Perkins (1913) noted that this species has been recorded flying during the day and has habits rather similar to those of Megalotica holombra.

External links

Larentiinae
Endemic moths of Hawaii